Capes Lake is a lake located on Vancouver Island west of the south end of Comox Lake.

References

Alberni Valley
Lakes of Vancouver Island
Nelson Land District